Radek Juška (born 8 March 1993, in Starovičky) is a Czech track and field athlete who competes in the long jump.

Career
Raised in Starovičky, in the south-eastern Břeclav District, Juška made his international debut for the Czech Republic at the 2012 World Junior Championships in Athletics.

In 2013, he won the Czech under-23 titles in both the long jump and triple jump. He followed this up with his first senior national title at the 2014 Czech Indoor Championships. He had his senior international debut that year at the 2014 European Team Championships, clearing  to take eighth place overall. He gained a wild card selection for the 2014 European Athletics Championships, but a torn abdominal muscle suffered at the national championships that year meant he was not fit to compete.

Under the tutelage of Josef Karas (a former decathlete), Juška was encouraged to focus on both his athletics and his studies at the University of Economics, Prague. He returned to fitness in time for the beginning of the 2015 season and claimed the Czech indoor title for a second time. He was selected for the home team for the 2015 European Athletics Indoor Championships in Prague. Despite entering as an outsider, having a sub-eight-metre personal best, he managed to qualify for the final of the event – the last of the eight qualifiers. This also raised him to seventh in the global seasonal rankings. He was one of three Czech athletes to win medals on the first day of finals at the championships, alongside Ladislav Prášil and Eliška Klučinová.

Personal bests
Long jump outdoor –  (2017) 
Long jump indoor –  (2015)
Triple jump outdoor –  (2013)

International competitions

References

Living people
1993 births
Czech male long jumpers
People from Břeclav District
World Athletics Championships athletes for the Czech Republic
Athletes (track and field) at the 2016 Summer Olympics
Olympic athletes of the Czech Republic
Universiade medalists in athletics (track and field)
Universiade gold medalists for the Czech Republic
Czech Athletics Championships winners
Medalists at the 2017 Summer Universiade
Sportspeople from the South Moravian Region